John Brown's Body is an eight-piece reggae and dub band based out of Ithaca, New York and Boston, Massachusetts. They have been together for two decades and have been hailed as "Future Roots, Reggae and Dub with an intricately balanced weaving of vocals, percussion, keyboard, bass, guitar and a stunning three-piece horn section that ties it all together" (WRUV). John Brown's Body (or JBB) is building "a legacy that has inspired and carved a path for the now thriving contemporary American reggae scene" (Rudeboy Reggae).  

Formed in Ithaca, New York, in the mid 1990s, JBB was one of a small handful of U.S. reggae bands that began touring nationally. Since then, JBB has played an important role in helping define distinctly "American reggae." JBB's music is steeped in traditional vibes, but unapologetically incorporates elements from other genres. While most American reggae bands tackled typical reggae themes (such as religion and marijuana), JBB acted more like an indie band, writing songs that used the vocabulary of reggae to express their own experiences. Their unique approach resonated with the masses.

The group's 2008 full-length record, Amplify, hit #1 on the Billboard Reggae Chart followed by 2012's JBB In Dub reaching #1 on iTunes Reggae Chart. They also topped both Billboard and iTunes Reggae Charts at #1 with 2013's Kings And Queens and 2016's Fireflies.

Today, JBB's signature style has become the norm for U.S. reggae bands, and many in the genre admittedly point to John Brown's Body as a key influence. Their eleventh studio release, Fireflies was released September 9, 2016 on Easy Star Records and debuted at #1 on the Billboard and iTunes Reggae charts.

History

Formation, development, and studio albums (1996-2006)
John Brown's Body was formed in the mid-1990s. Beginning in 1996, JBB released their first studio album, All Time on their own label, I-Town Records. The album made Rolling Stones "Top 10 Indie Records List".

Following their debut, JBB signed with reggae label Shanachie Records, then released three albums; their sophomore album,  Among Them in 1998, their third album, This Day in 2000, and their fourth album, Spirits All Around Us in 2002.

The Boston Herald called JBB "one of the world's best roots-style reggae bands" following the release of This Day. After positive reviews, the band appeared at Bob Marley Day Festival in Miami, Florida, alongside Lauryn Hill and other artists. However, after the release of This Day, Mike Keenan left JBB to raise his children, Oscar and Damon (Damon in 2004) and returned in 2006, but was not an "official" member until 2006. 

Also, after the release of Spirits All Around Us, the band had become a national name. The appeared at The Sierra Nevada World Music Festival, Reggae on the Rocks and Wakarusa.

In 2005, JBB signed with New York City record label Easy Star and released their fifth studio album Pressure Points, evolving from a traditional roots approach to a twist on reggae and dub they titled "Future Roots".  Pressure Points was critically acclaimed and the Village Voice review called JBB "reverent as well as revolutionary",  while Popmatters described the record as their "strongest, most consistent effort to date."  Elliot Martin wrote 8 out of 11 songs, while Martin had only written a few songs from previous albums. Kevin Kinsella wrote the other three.

Disaster, departures, and recovery (2006-2009)
Scott Palmer, the band's bassist, died from cancer in 2006. However, Lead vocalist Martin and drummer/co-founder Tommy Benedetti continued the band.

The band recruited Boston bassist Nate Edgar to replace Scott; he had been a fan since seeing Scott playing years earlier with DJ Logic's Project Logic.

More JBB line-up changes include the departure of vocalist and rhythm guitarist Kinsella who had formally left the band on good terms and organist/guitarist Nate "Silas" Richardson who stepped out to spend more time with his newborn son.

JBB replaced Richardson with guitarist Keenan who was a member of The Tribulations and a previous member of the band who also stepped out to raise his children. JBB continued to tour. Near the end of the journey, Dan Delacruz left the band and Chris "C-Money" Welter who joined the punk-reggae band Slightly Stoopid.

Kinsella's departure freed Martin to become the band leader and he pointed them in new musical directions. For years, a creative rift separated the two primary songwriters and childhood friends.  Kinsella's songs tended towards religious and roots-reggae sounds, more like the band's beginnings, while Martin's writing emphasized futuristic and atypical rhythms, as well as dense metaphorical imagery. "I used to think that having two songwriters and vocalists was a strength that made us unique, but it probably confused a lot of people. Now our sound is more cohesive," says Benedetti, "We feel comfortable with one another and you can hear it in the music we're creating."

Just before Kinsella's exit, Martin wrote three 'rooster' tracks, "Give Yourself Over", "Speak of the Devil", and "Be at Peace". When Kinsella quit, Martin felt less pressure to make everything fit within a perceived JBB sound. He then wrote "The Gold", an up-beat drum and bass-inflected tune featuring a guitar line reminiscent of an Ennio Morricone Spaghetti Western soundtrack and "Make Your Move", which brought the band closer to hip-hop. According to Martin, the title track was one of the band's original ideas. He stated "the seeds for that one [The Gold] are five years old. It was originally a hip hop beat, like a Funkadelic song. The bass line was the same, but much more slinky. I didn't know what it would become, but I knew it should be the lead for this record."

In 2007, the band went into the studio to work on their sixth record at More Sound, a recording studio owned by sound engineer Jason "Jocko" Randall in Syracuse, New York. During that time, Elliot began to notice problems with his vocal strength and endurance. After months of doctor visits and vocal training, Elliot was diagnosed with vocal polyps. In early 2008, Martin had surgery to remove the polyps on his vocal chords and began voice training to teach him how to lessen the strain on his throat. Another quote from the band's website states "I feel better every day. Each show back after surgery, I could feel myself getting stronger. Now I think I'm doing things I couldn't even do before," along with saying, "Add that to the energy of the new line-up and this new batch of songs." 

The band released Amplify on New York City label Easy Star Records. Amplify debuted at #1 on Billboards Reggae Albums charts, #10 on CMJ's World Music Chart, as well as making it on the iTunes "Beat of 2008" list for reggae records. The band toured across the U.S. for the first time in nearly two years. 

All Music Guide wrote that "Elliot Martin has taken firmer control of the group and now it [JBB] is now a completely different organism; although the John Brown's Body sound is still distinctly reggae-ish, it's denser, swirlier, sometimes downright funky and loaded with more melodic hooks."

Success and touring: Re-Amplify EP (2009-2010)
On March 17, 2009, JBB released their first remix EP Re-Amplify under the Easy Star label. It debuted in the Billboard Reggae Top 10. The EP featured remixes of JBB's Amplify album by artists from around the world including Dubmatix (from Toronto), WrongTom (from London) and their friend Kasongo from Gym Class Heroes.

After a few changes to the horn section, JBB brought in trombonist Scott Flynn, saxophonist Drew Sayers and trumpet player Sam Dechenne. In 2009, the band travelled to the United Kingdom for 16 shows with labelmates Easy Star All-Stars and 11 shows in New Zealand with The Black Seeds, also Easy Start label mates. The tour led to a musical brotherhood with The Black Seeds and they later performed together at the 2010 Grassroots Music Festival in Ithaca, NY.

In December 2009, JBB covered "Bankrobber" by The Clash for a charity record named Shatter the Hotel: The Songs of Joe Strummer in Dub. All proceeds from the record went to benefit Strummerville: The Joe Strummer Foundation for New Music.

In 2010, JBB performed on Jam Cruise off the coast of Jamaica and Grand Cayman Island. Then, in April through May 2010, the group performed their first tours ever in France, Belgium, Germany, the Netherlands and in Canada performing at festivals and headlining clubs.

Return to the studio: Kings and Queens and Fireflies (2013–2016)
On April 16, 2013, JBB released its eighth studio album, Kings and Queens. Neil Kelly of PopMatters wrote about the album, "where they have stayed true to their roots on previous releases, JBB incorporates many electronic embellishments and elements on Kings and Queens, giving the album as a whole a modern, American touch." The album featured 12 new tracks and was released on iTunes download, CD and 180 gram vinyl LP. The latter was the first time that a vinyl version was readily available for fan consumption. The album debuted at #1 on the Billboard and iTunes Reggae charts. It also reached #23 on Billboard's Heatseekers Chart, #4 on the Northeast New Artist Chart, and #188 on the Top 200 Digital Albums.

In September 2016, the band released the album Fireflies, which went on to top the Billboard Reggae Albums Chart.

Influences 
Elliot Martin stated that while writing Amplify he was influenced by artists including Sigur Rós, Batch, Toumani Diabate, Sly and Robbie, Radiohead, Talib Kweli, Aswad, Funkadelic, King Tubby, Roots Manuva, Masaru Sato and Midnite (whose lead singer, Vaughn Benjamin, lends a vocal to the end of "Speak Of The Devil").

"I think that the strongest reggae was coming out of the UK in the 70's and early 80's," Elliot explains. "It was the best produced, had the most complex song writing; it's the most progressive reggae that's been made. Steel Pulse, Aswad, Reggae Regular, Misty in Roots, Mikey Dread, Dennis Bovell and Linton Kwesi Johnson were doing ground-breaking stuff. I want to pick up where those artists left off. Of course, we don't come close to what those artists did, but I think that's where the idea comes from—that reggae can take other forms. I guess I'm just saying that I see our music as progressive reggae."

Awards 
2010: #2 ZonaReGGae BEST of '09 - The People 'REVIVAL' [Portugal]
2009: Best of 2009 Reggae Records – ZonaReggae [Portugal]
2008: #1 Billboard Reggae Chart debut
2008: CMJ World Music Chart Top 10 debut
2008: iTunes Top 10 Reggae Records selection of 2008
2008: Best Dance/Dub/Club Album nomination NAR Lifestyle Music Awards [Barcelona, Spain]
2008: Most Anticipated Albums of 2008 – ThePier.org

Recent collaborations 
Martin performed vocals with Iowa reggae band Public Property on their album Work to Do. Martin Collaborated with the Baltimore based band Can't Hang on their 2009 Release Ride The Lightrail.

Discography

Studio albums

EP's/Live & Dub albums

Singles

References

External links
 Official website
 Live Recordings from Internet Archive

American reggae musical groups
Easy Star Records artists